Jörg-Uwe Hahn  (born 21 September 1956 in Kassel) is a German politician of the FDP.

Life 
Hahn studied German law in Frankfurt am Main. From 2009 until early 2014, Hahn was minister of justice in Hesse. After the FDP was dropped from the ruling coalition following the 2013 Hessian State election, Hahn resigned as leader of the Hessian FDP. Hahn is married and has two children.

External links 

 Official website

References 

Free Democratic Party (Germany) politicians
1956 births
Politicians from Kassel
Living people